Mohamadpur railway station is a railway station on the Bakhtiyarpur–Tilaiya line under the Danapur railway division of East Central Railway zone. It is situated beside National Highway 82 at Sonsa in Nawada district in the Indian state of Bihar.

References 

Railway stations in Nawada district
Danapur railway division